John Fairfax was an English  poet, editor and co-founder, with John Moat, of the Arvon Foundation in 1968. Nephew of George and Kit Barker. Educated at Plymouth College, he skipped university in favour of his uncle's "collection of misfits" in Zennor, near St Ives in Cornwall. John avoided the poetry scene, quietly producing his own work.

Fairfax died in Reading on 14 January 2009.

Poetry collections
Frontier of Going (1969)
Adrift on the Star-brow of Taliesin (1974) 
Bone Harvest Done (1980)

External links 
Obituary, The Guardian
Obituary, The Independent

1930 births
2009 deaths
20th-century English poets
People educated at Plymouth College
English male poets
20th-century English male writers